Hector Manuel Garnica Venegas (born 12 October 1974) is a Mexican former professional boxer who competed from 1993 to 2009. He held the WBC Mundo Hispano, WBC Latino and WBA Fedecaribe light welterweight titles.

Professionoal career
Hector took out the veteran Isaias Cabrera to win the WBC Mundo Hispano light welterweight title.

On August 25, 2006, he upset former WBA light welterweight Champion Carlos Maussa to win the WBC Latino and WBA Fedecaribe light welterweight titles.

Manuel would then go onto lose a fight with undefeated Mike Alvarado.

References

External links

Boxers from Jalisco
Light-welterweight boxers
1974 births
Living people
Mexican male boxers